Laud Weiner is a short film written and directed by Philip Euling, starring David Hyde Pierce.
The cast also includes Marisol Nichols, Jake Muxworthy, and James Oliver.

Plot

The film follows Laud Weiner, an oblivious, self-satisfied, and spoiled Hollywood manager-producer, as he explains his 'hard' work to the camera while in reality taking credit for other people's ideas and making everyone's life difficult.

Broadcast and DVD

The film was broadcast on the Independent Film Channel and is one of a number of short films featuring celebrities on the DVD short-film compilation "Celebrity Mix" put out by TLA Entertainment Group.

Film Festivals
 Montreal World Film Festival 2002
 Edinburgh International Film Festival 2002
 Palm Springs International Festival of Short Films
 Philadelphia Film Festival 2002
 American Cinematheque 2002
 Canadian Film Centre's Worldwide Short Film Festival 2002
 Cinequest Film Festival 2003
 Hamptons International Film Festival 2002
 Newport Beach Film Festival 2002
 Rhode Island International Film Festival 2002
 Maui Film Festival 2003
 Cinema Society of San Diego 2003
 Port Townsend Film Festival, Washington 2002
 Silver Lake Film Festival 2002
 Sidewalk Moving Picture Festival 2002
 Great Lakes Independent Film Festival, Erie, PA 2002
 Wine Country Film Festival 2002
 Brooklyn International Film Festival 2002
 Los Angeles International Short Film Festival 2001

Reaction

The film won Best Short Film at the Wine Country Film Festival in 2002.

References

External links
 

2001 short films
2001 films
Films set in California